Peter Meechan may refer to:
 Peter Meechan (composer) (born 1980), British composer, conductor, and music publisher
 Peter Meechan (footballer) (1872–1915), Scottish professional footballer